Bloomfield Green Historic District is a historic district located in Bloomfield, Essex County, New Jersey, United States. The district was added to the National Register of Historic Places on April 20, 1978.

See also
National Register of Historic Places listings in Essex County, New Jersey

References

Bloomfield, New Jersey
Houses on the National Register of Historic Places in New Jersey
Gothic Revival architecture in New Jersey
Geography of Essex County, New Jersey
National Register of Historic Places in Essex County, New Jersey
Historic districts in Essex County, New Jersey
Houses in Essex County, New Jersey
Historic districts on the National Register of Historic Places in New Jersey
New Jersey Register of Historic Places